The 178th (Canadien-Français) Battalion, CEF was a unit in the Canadian Expeditionary Force during the First World War.

Based in Victoriaville, Quebec, the unit began recruiting during the winter of 1915/16 in Military Districts 4 and 5, and in eastern Ontario. The battalion absorbed the 233rd Battalion (Canadiens-Français du Nord-Ouest), CEF, in March 1917, and sailed to England later that same month. Upon arrival, the 178th Battalion was absorbed into the 10th Reserve Battalion on March 16, 1917.

The 178th (Canadien-Français) Battalion had one officer commanding: Lieutenant-Colonel René-Arthur de la Bruère Girouard.

The perpetuation of the battalion was assigned to the Three Rivers Regiment in 1920. This regiment is now named 12e Régiment blindé du Canada.

References

 Meek, John F. Over the Top! The Canadian Infantry in the First World War. Orangeville, Ont.: The Author, 1971.

Battalions of the Canadian Expeditionary Force